The Arts Queensland Judith Wright Calanthe Award is awarded annually as part of the Queensland Premier's Literary Awards for a book of collected poems or for a single poem of substantial length published in book form.

Winners

2020 

 Winner: Pi O, Heide (Giramondo)
Peter Boyle, Enfolded in the Wings of a Great Darkness (Vagabond Press)
 Stuart Cooke, Lyre (UWA Publishing)
Ellen van Neerven, Throat (UQP)
 Charmaine Papertalk Green, Nganajungu Yagu (Cordite Books)

2019 
Winner: Alison Whittaker, Blakwork (Magabala)
Liam Ferney, Hot Take (Hunter)
Keri Glastonbury, Newcastle Sonnets (Giramondo)
Marjon Mossammaparast, That Sight (Cordite)
Omar Sakr, The Lost Arabs (UQP)

2018
Winner: Michael Farrell, I Love Poetry (Giramondo)
Pam Brown, click here for what we do (Vagabond Press)
Bonny Cassidy, Chatelaine (Giramondo)
Oscar Schwartz, The Honeymoon Stage (Giramondo)
Bella Li, Lost Lake (Vagabond Press)

2017
Winner: Antigone Kefala, Fragments (Giramondo)
Jordie Albiston, Euclid's Dog (GloriaSMH Press)
Carmen Leigh Keates, Meteorites (Whitmore Press)
Cassie Lewis, The Blue Decodes (Grand Parade Poets)
Omar Sakr, These Wild Houses (Cordite Books)

2016
Winner: David Musgrave, Anatomy of Voice (GloriaSMH Press)
Joel Deane, Year of the Wasp (Hunter Publishers)
Liam Ferney, Content (Hunter Publishers)
Sarah Holland-Batt, The Hazards (University of Queensland Press)
Chloe Wilson, Not Fox Nor Axe (Hunter Publishers)

2015
Winner: Les Murray, Waiting For the Past (Black Inc)
Susan Bradley Smith, Beds For All Who Come (Five Islands Press)
David Brooks, Open House (University of Queensland Press)
Lucy Dougan, The Guardians (Giramondo)
Robert Adamson, Net Needle (Black Inc)

2014
Winner: David Malouf, Earth Hour (University of Queensland Press)
Liam Ferney, Boom (Grande Parade Publishing)
Rachael Briggs, Free Logic(University of Queensland Press)
Anthony Lawrence, Signal Flare
Judith Beveridge, Devadatta's Poems (Giramondo Publishing)

2012
Winner: Peter Rose, Crimson Crop (UWA Publishing)
Simon West, The Yellow Gum's Conversion
David McCooey, Outside
Anthony Lawrence, The Welfare of My Enemy "Of all the words for Missing, there's"
Rhyll McMaster, Late Night Shopping (Brandl & Schlesinger)

2009
Winner: Emma Jones, The Striped World (Faber and Faber)
Sarah Holland-Batt, Aria (University of Queensland Press)
John Kinsella, The Divine Comedy: Journeys Through a Regional Geography (University of Queensland Press)
Bronwyn Lea, The Other Way Out (Giramondo)

2008
 Winner: David Malouf, Typewriter Music (University of Queensland Press)
 Judith Bishop, Event (Salt Publishing)
 Anthony Lawrence, Bark (University of Queensland Press)
 Alan Wearne, The Australian Popular Songbook (Giramondo)

2007
  Dr Laurie Duggan, The Passenger (University of Queensland Press)

2006
 Professor John Kinsella, The New Arcadia

2005
 Sarah Day, The Ship

2004
 Judith Beveridge, Wolf Notes

See also
Judith Wright
Australian literature
List of poetry awards
List of years in poetry
List of years in literature

Notes

Australian poetry